Eamonn or Éamon or Eamon may refer to:

Eamonn (given name), an Irish male given name
Eamon (singer) (born 1983), American R&B singer-songwriter and harmonicist
Eamon (video game), a 1980 computer role-playing game for the Apple II
"Éamonn an Chnoic" (Ned of the Hill), an Irish song
Eamon Valda, fictional character in Robert Jordan's fantasy book series The Wheel of Time

See also
 Ayman